Hello Love is a studio album by country music singer Hank Snow. It was released in 1974 by RCA Victor (catalog APL1-0441).

The album debuted on Billboard magazine's country album chart on April 13, 1974, peaked at No. 4, and remained on the chart for a total of 15 weeks. It included the No. 1 hit "Hello Love". It was Snow's last album to break into the Top 25.

Track listing
Side A
 "Hello Love"
 "I've Got to Give It All to You"
 "Today I Started Loving You Again"
 "The Last Thing on My Mind"
 "It Just Happened That Way"

Side B
 "Daisy a Day"
 "I Have You and That's Enough for Me"
 "Somewhere My Love"
 "I Washed My Hands in Muddy Water"
 "Why Me, Lord"

Charts

Weekly charts

Year-end charts

References

1974 albums
Hank Snow albums
RCA Victor albums